Lobocephalus is a genus of mites in the family Ologamasidae.

Species
 Lobocephalus acuminatus Kramer, 1898

References

Ologamasidae